The Whitefaced Woodland is a sheep breed from the Woodlands of Hope an area in the South Pennines in England. It is a combination of two breeds, the Woodland and the Penistone sheep after the Yorkshire town where sheep sales have been held since 1699.  It is thought to be closely related to the Swaledale and the Lonk.  Substantial commercial flocks of the Whitefaced Woodland are kept in its region of origin, but it is listed as a vulnerable breed by the Rare Breeds Survival Trust, since there are fewer than 900 registered breeding females in Great Britain.

Characteristics
The Whitefaced Woodland is one of the largest hill breeds, with ewes sometimes weighing more the 60 kg (132 lbs) when kept in lowland pastures. Unlike most Pennine breeds it has a white face and legs and short, fine wool. The staple length of the wool is between 10 cm (4.7 inches) to 15 cm (7.1 inches) with a spinning count of 50's to 54's. The average fleece weight is 2 kg (4.5 lb) to 3 kg (6.5 lb). Its main use has been as a meat breed.  However, its wool is used in carpet. Both sexes are horned and the ram horns are heavily spiraled.

References

Sheep breeds
Sheep breeds originating in England
Animal breeds on the RBST Watchlist